Felicity Ace was a roll-on/roll-off cargo ship (Pure Car/Truck Carrier) built by Shin Kurushima Dockyard in 2005, owned and operated by Mitsui O.S.K. Lines of Japan, and registered in Panama. She caught fire in February 2022 south of the Azores, then capsized and sank in early March.

Design and construction 
Felicity Ace was designed for the dedicated carriage of cars and trucks. The vessel's deadweight was 17,738 metric tons, and she was measured as 60,118 gross tons.

The ship was built at Shin Kurushima Dockyard's Ōnishi facility in Imabari, Ehime, Japan, as Yard No. 5306 for Mitsui O.S.K. Lines of Japan and issues with IMO number 9293911. The ship's keel was laid on 9 December 2004, and she was launched on 2 July 2005. Felicity Ace was completed on 5 October 2005 and delivered to Mitsui O.S.K. Lines (MOL) of Tokyo, Japan in the registered ownership of Aurora Car Maritime Transport SA and under the Panamanian flag. From 2011 her registered owner was Snowscape Car Carriers SA, remaining under MOL group management.

2022 fire 
The ship sailed from Emden, Germany, on 10 February 2022, carrying 3,965 Volkswagen Group cars, including Audi, Porsche, Lamborghini and Bentley models. Porsche lost 1,117 cars on the ship, Audi claimed a loss of 1,944 vehicles, Bentley lost 189, Lamborghini lost 85, and Volkswagen lost 561 cars. 

In addition to numerous family vehicles, including Volkswagen ID.4 and Audi e-tron electric cars, the ship carried fifteen high performance Lamborghini Aventador LP 780-4 Ultimae vehicles, with an estimated retail price above  each. The ship also carried some privately-owned cars and trucks of varying makes and models along with numerous tractors. The Ultimae was the last edition of the Aventador to be produced, and at the time of the accident, production of the Aventador had ended.

The cargo section caught fire on 16 February 2022, while crossing the North Atlantic heading for Davisville, Rhode Island. All 22 crew members abandoned the ship and survived, being evacuated by the Portuguese Navy. The Azorean harbourmaster told Reuters that lithium-ion batteries in electric cars ignited and the fire could only be extinguished with special equipment. Contrary to speculations in the media, it is unknown whether an electric car caused the initial fire.

On 18 February, Smit Salvage were contracted to salvage the ship.

Two large tugs with firefighting equipment were ordered to support the vessel from Gibraltar. In addition, a salvage craft with firefighting equipment was set to arrive from Rotterdam on 23 or 24 February. A Portuguese Navy spokesman said that Felicity Ace was unlikely to be towed to a port in the Azores due to its size.

The ship drifted guideless and burning on the Atlantic for about a week. A team from Smit was able to board and stabilize the ship. The fire was out at this time and a towing connection to a tug was also established.

Sinking 	
On 1 March 2022, Felicity Ace was reported to have capsized and sunk. MOL was unable to confirm if any oil pollution had occurred.

See also
 List of roll-on/roll-off vessel accidents

References

External links

Ro-ro ships
Ship fires
Shipwrecks in the Atlantic Ocean
Maritime incidents in 2022
2005 ships
Ships built in Japan
2022 fires in Europe
February 2022 events in Europe
March 2022 events
Ships sunk with no fatalities